Sudiste is a village in Mulgi Parish in Viljandi County in southern Estonia. It borders the villages Mäeküla, Ainja, Karksi and Hirmuküla.

References

Villages in Viljandi County
Kreis Pernau